Scythris decrepidella is a moth of the family Scythrididae. It was described by Bengt Å. Bengtsson in 1997. It is found in Egypt and southern Iran.

References

decrepidella
Moths described in 1997